Laitmynsaw is a village located in Mylliem Tehsil, East Khasi Hills District. As of the year of 2022, it had a totalPopulation of around 198 people. Its sex ratio was 1,058 females per thousand males, which is higher than that of Meghalaya (984). Children age 0-6 number 33, or 18.64% of the total population. The village's literacy rate is 90.28%, higher than the average rate of Meghalaya (74.43%); 88.57% for males and 91.89% for females. The village was declared an Open Defeaction Free(ODF) Village on 2 October 2016 and was awarded with a certificate from the then MLA of Mylliem constituency, Ronnie V Lyngdoh. The village was also awarded the most initiative village of East Khasi Hills in the year 2017 and was awarded a cash process of ₹ 50,000. The people of the village have been indulged in a practice of cleaning the village and surrounding are once a week and the teachings is being passed on to the younger generations as well. 

The village boasts Mattilang Park, which is a tourist destination. Opposite to the park is the Elephant Falls. The village also has a lower primary school run by the government, which enrolls 33 students and employs two teachers. The village has a headman who is chosen by the people.

References

Villages in East Khasi Hills district